The Argayash National Okrug (Arğayaş milli okrugı; Bashkir ) was a national okrug for the Bashkirs of the Chelyabinsk Oblast of the RSFSR in the Soviet Union.  It existed from January to November 1934.

History
On 15 November 1917, Trans-Ural Bashkiria was added to the nascent Bashkurdistan by decision of the Bashkir Central Soviet as Argayash Canton.  Although an exclave surrounded by the RSFSR proper, this canton existed as an administrative and territorial unit of the Bashkir Autonomous Socialist Soviet Republic until 1930.  In that year, the cantonal system of administration was eliminated and the former Argayash Canton was organized as two raions, Argayash and Kunashak, while remaining a part of the Bashkir ASSR.

On 17 January 1934, the Ural Oblast of the RSFSR which surrounded the former Argayash Canton was disbanded by the All-Russian Central Executive Committee and divided into three new oblasts, one of which was Chelyabinsk Oblast.  On the same day, the area was transferred to this new oblast as the Argayash National Okrug.

Later that year, on 17 November 1934, the All-Russian Central Executive Committee liquidated the national okrug and the area was thenceforth administered as a normal part of Chelyabinsk Oblast.  There was some popular interest in reviving the okrug in the Argayash and Kunashak areas of the oblast in the late 1980s and early 1990s, but no official action was taken and the area remains a part of Chelyabinsk Oblast, now a part of the Russian Federation.

Notes

References

Autonomous okrugs of the Soviet Union
States and territories established in 1934
States and territories disestablished in 1934
History of Bashkortostan
Chelyabinsk Oblast
1934 establishments in the Soviet Union